The Later Zhao (319–351) was a dynasty of the Sixteen Kingdoms in northern China. It was founded by the Shi family of the Jie ethnicity. According to Alexander Vovin, the Jie were most likely a Yeniseian people and spoke next to Chinese one of the Yeniseian languages. However, according to most of other authors, they were a Turkic people. The Later Zhao was the second in territorial size to the Former Qin dynasty that once unified northern China under Fu Jiān.

When Later Zhao was founded by former Han general Shi Le, the capital was at Xiangguo (襄國, in modern Xingtai, Hebei), but in 335 Shi Hu moved the capital to Yecheng (鄴城, in modern Handan, Hebei), where it would remain for the rest of the state's history (except for Shi Zhi's brief attempt to revive the state at Xiangguo).

Rulers of the Later Zhao

Rulers family tree

See also
Jie (ethnic group)
Wei–Jie war
List of past Chinese ethnic groups
Wu Hu
Buddhism in China
Memoirs of Eminent Monks
Liu Yuan
Shi Le
Shi Hu
Ran Min
Wuhu uprising

References 

 
319 establishments
351 disestablishments
Dynasties in Chinese history
Former countries in Chinese history
4th-century establishments in China